The French destroyer Bison was a  (contre-torpilleurs) built for the French Navy during the 1920s.

Career
The Bison served during the Norwegian Campaign in World War II. While evacuating Allied troops at Namsos, the ship came under German air attack and exploded after being struck in the forward magazine by a bomb, dropped by a Ju 87 from I./StG 1, killing 136 members of her crew and causing the ship to sink by the bow.

 came to the rescue of the surviving crew, rescuing sixty-nine of the French sailors in the water and sinking the hull of the ship. However, the Afridi soon came under air attack and sank as well, and among the dead were thirty-five of the surviving crew of the Bison.

Notes

References

 
 

Destroyers sunk by aircraft
Guépard-class destroyers
1928 ships
Ships built in France
Maritime incidents in May 1940
World War II shipwrecks in the Norwegian Sea
Ships sunk by German aircraft